Harold Corlett Atkinson (March 27, 1900 – 1977) was a Canadian politician. He served in the Legislative Assembly of New Brunswick as member of the Liberal party from 1948 to 1952.

References

1900 births
1977 deaths
20th-century Canadian legislators
New Brunswick Liberal Association MLAs
Politicians from Saint John, New Brunswick
Politicians from Sherbrooke